Solar Energy Generating Systems (SEGS) is a concentrated solar power plant in California, United States. With the combined capacity from three separate locations at 354 megawatt (MW), it was once the world's second largest solar thermal energy generating facility, until the commissioning of the even larger Ivanpah facility in 2014. It consisted of nine solar power plants in California's Mojave Desert, where insolation is among the best available in the United States.  

SEGS I–II (44 MW) were located at Daggett; they have been replaced with a solar photovoltaic farm. 

SEGS III–VII (150 MW) were installed at Kramer Junction; only SEGS VI remains active.

SEGS VIII–IX (160 MW) are located at Harper Lake. NextEra Energy Resources operates and partially owns the plants located at Kramer Junction.  On January 26, 2018, the SEGS VIII and IX at Harper Lake were sold to renewable energy company Terra-Gen, LLC.

A tenth plant (SEGS X, 80 MW) had been in construction and SEGS XI and SEGS XII had been planned by Luz Industries, but the developer filed for bankruptcy in 1992, because it was unable to secure construction financing.  The site of SEGS X was later licensed for a solar photovoltaic farm, Lockhart Solar PV II.

Most of the thermal facilities were retired by 2021, and photovoltaics were built on the same sites.

Plants' scale and operations
Before retirement and replacement of SEGS I-VII with solar photovoltaics, the plants had a 354 MW net (394 MW gross) installed capacity. In addition, the turbines could be utilized at night by burning natural gas.

NextEra claimed in 2009 that the solar plants could power 232,500 homеs (during the day, at peak power) and displace 3,800 tons of pollution pеr year that would have been produced if the electricity had been providеd by fossil fuels, such as oil.

As an example of cost, in 2002, one of the 30 MW Kramer Junction sites required $90 million to construct, and its operation and maintenance cost was about $3 million per year (4.6 cents per kilowatt hour). With a considered lifetime of 20 years, the operation, maintenance and investments interest and depreciation triples the price, to approximately 14 cents per kilowatt hour.

Principle of operation

The installation uses parabolic trough, solar thermal technology along with natural gas to generate electricity. About 90% of the electricity is produced by the sunlight. Natural gas is only used when the solar power is insufficient to meet the demand from Southern California Edison, the distributor of power in southern California.

Mirrors
The parabolic mirrors are shaped like quarter-pipes. The sun shines onto the panels made of glass, which are 94% reflective, unlike a typical mirror, which is only 70% reflective. The mirrors automatically track the sun throughout the day. The greatest source of mirror breakage is wind, with 3,000 mirrors typically replaced each year. Operators can turn the mirrors to protect them during intense wind storms. An automated washing mechanism is used to periodically clean the parabolic reflective panels.  The term "field area" is assessed as the actual collector area.

Heat transfer
The reflected light focused at the central tube is 71 to 80 times more intense than the ordinary sunlight. The synthetic oil transfers its heat to water, which boils and drives the Rankine cycle steam turbine, thereby generating electricity. Synthetic oil is used to carry the heat (instead of water) to keep the pressure within manageable parameters.

Individual locations
The SEGS power plants were built by Luz Industries, and commissioned between December 20, 1984 and October 1, 1990. After Luz Industries' bankruptcy in 1991 plants were sold to various investor groups as individual projects, and expansion including three more plants was halted.

Kramer Junction employs about 95 people and 45 people work at Harper Lake.

Harper Lake 
They were the last, the largest, and the most advanced of the nine plants at SEGS, designed to take advantage of the economies of scale. Construction of the tenth plant in the same locality was halted because of the bankruptcy of Luz Industries. Construction of the approved eleventh and twelfth plants never started. Each of the three planned plants would had 80 MW of installed capacity. Abengoa Solar recently constructed the 280MW Mojave Solar Project (MSP) adjacent to the SEGS VIII and SEGS IX plants. The MSP also uses concentrating solar thermal trough technology.

SEGS VIII, starting February 2020, no more burned natural gas. Last production month was October 2021. SEGS IX stopped burning natural gas starting October 2020, except for January 2021.

Kramer Junction

This location receives an average of 340 days of sunshine per year, which makes it an ideal place for solar power generation. The average direct normal radiation (DNR) is 7.44 kWh/m2/day (310 W/m2), one of the best in the nation.  This was the location of SEGS II - VII, which were retired in 2019.  As of 2021, they were going to be replaced with a new solar photovoltaic array called Resurgence I.

Daggett
SEGS II was shut down in 2014 and was replaced by Sunray 3 (EIA plant code 10438), a 13,8 MW photovoltaic system. SEGS I was shut down one year later and replaced by 20 MW PV system Sunray 2 (EIA plant code 10437). Sunray 2 and Sunray 3 started production in 2017 as per EIA data.

Accidents and incidents 
In February 1999, a  Mineral Oil storage tank exploded at the SEGS I (Daggett) solar power plant, sending flames and smoke into the sky. Authorities were trying to keep flames away from two adjacent containers that held sulfuric acid and sodium hydroxide.

See also

 List of concentrating solar thermal power companies
 List of photovoltaic power stations
 List of solar thermal power stations
 Renewable energy in the United States
 Renewable portfolio standard
 Solar power
 Solar power plants in the Mojave Desert
 List of largest power stations in the world
 Solana Generating Station

References 

Energy infrastructure completed in 1984
Energy infrastructure completed in 1985
Energy infrastructure completed in 1986
Energy infrastructure completed in 1987
Energy infrastructure completed in 1988
Energy infrastructure completed in 1989
Energy infrastructure completed in 1990
Solar power in the Mojave Desert
Solar power stations in California
Buildings and structures in San Bernardino County, California
NextEra Energy
Solar thermal energy